Hoseynabad-e Do (also Romanized as Ḩoseynābād-e Do; also known as Ḩoseynābād and Ḩoseynābād-e Māh Rīnow) is a village in Kavirat Rural District, Chatrud District, Kerman County, Kerman Province, Iran. At the 2006 census, its population was 25, in 4 families.

References 

Populated places in Kerman County